IPC Marthandam Central Church is one of the central churches of The Indian Pentecostal Church of God. It is one of the popular spiritual centres in Kanyakumari District of Tamil Nadu, India, serving holistic developments.

Kanyakumari
Churches in Tamil Nadu
Pentecostalism in India